Dzerzhinsky (masculine), Dzerzhinskaya (feminine), or Dzerzhinskoye (neuter) is the name of several inhabited localities in Russia.

Urban localities
Dzerzhinsky, Moscow Oblast, a town under the administrative jurisdiction of Moscow Oblast

Rural localities
Dzerzhinsky, Novosibirsk Oblast, a settlement in Iskitimsky District of Novosibirsk Oblast
Dzerzhinsky, Voronezh Oblast, a settlement in Ertilsky District of Voronezh Oblast
Dzerzhinskoye, Republic of Dagestan, a selo in Khasavyurtovsky District of the Republic of Dagestan
Dzerzhinskoye, Krasnoyarsk Krai, a selo in Dzerzhinsky District of Krasnoyarsk Krai
Dzerzhinskoye, name of several other rural localities

See also
imeni Dzerzhinskogo, Russia, name of several rural localities